CJC may refer to:

Law and jurisprudence
 The , a collection of Imperial pronouncements issued from 529 to 534 by order of (Eastern) Roman Emperor Justinian I, comprising:
  (the Justinian Code);
 Digest (Roman law), a compendium or digest of juristic writings;
 the Institutes of Justinian; and
 Canadian Judicial Council, the regulating body for Canadian judges composed mostly of chief justices and associate chief justices of Canada's superior courts
 Criminal Justice Commission (Australia), the former commission for investigating corruption and misconduct in Queensland, Australia

Organizations
 Canadian Jewish Congress, a defunct umbrella group of Jewish organizations in Canada
 Collectives of Communist Youth, a juvenile Spanish Marxist–Leninist organization
 Community of Jesus' Compassion, an Anglican religious order founded in 1993

Education
 California Jazz Conservatory, a music conservatory in Berkeley, California.
 Catholic Junior College, a junior college in Singapore
 Central Johannesburg College, a South African college founded in September 2001
 Cisco Junior College, a community college located one mile north of Cisco, Texas
  (French: "Confederation of Young Researchers"), a national postgraduate representative body
 Cornway Junior College, a private, co-educational, day and boarding school in Zimbabwe.
 Cor Jesu College, a Catholic educational institution in Davao del Sur, Philippines

Other meanings
 Canadian Journal of Chemistry, a scientific journal published by the National Research Council of Canada
 CjC, an alias for electronic musician Conor J Curran
 Utah Children's Justice Center, These centers coordinates investigation and prosecution of child abuse, especially child sexual abuse
 The IATA code for El Loa Airport in Calama, Chile
 The ICAO code for Colgan Air, a US airline operating between 1991 and 2012